Red Street is a small, semi-rural village in the borough of Newcastle-under-Lyme, Staffordshire  north west of Stoke-on-Trent,  east of the neighbouring village of Audley and 1 mile (1.7 km) north of Chesterton.

Local amenities include a pub, community centre, butchers shop, church and primary school.

Wedgwood Monument 
Red Street is home to a large stone monument on the summit of Bignall Hill, which is dedicated to John Wedgwood (1760-1839). Wedgwood's monument was initially an obelisk erected in 1850. Following storm damage in 1976 it was reduced to a quarter of its original size, although the base is still substantial. The monument is a Grade II listed building. The monument is today reachable by footpaths off Deans Lane, and is the highest point in the area. It affords sweeping 360-degree views: south to the city of Stoke-on-Trent; north across the Cheshire Plains to Jodrell Bank; east to Mow Cop Castle and the Peak District; and west to the mountains of North Wales and Snowdonia.

Sport 
The village has its own football club Redstreet FC.

External links 
 Red Street FC
 Mitchell's Wood Farm Shop
 St. Chads Primary School, Newcastle, Staffs

Borough of Newcastle-under-Lyme
Villages in Staffordshire